In mathematical physics, nonlinear realization of a Lie group G  possessing a Cartan subgroup  H is a particular induced representation of G. In fact, it is a representation of a Lie algebra  of G in a neighborhood of its origin.
A nonlinear realization, when restricted to the subgroup H reduces to a linear representation.

A nonlinear realization technique is part and parcel of many field theories with spontaneous symmetry breaking, e.g., chiral models, chiral symmetry breaking, Goldstone boson theory,  classical Higgs field theory, gauge gravitation theory and supergravity.

Let G be a Lie group and  H  its Cartan subgroup which admits a linear representation in a vector space V. A Lie
algebra  of G splits into the sum  of the Cartan subalgebra   of H and its supplement , such that
 

There exists an open neighborhood  U of the unit of G  such
that any element   is uniquely brought into the form

Let  be an open neighborhood of the unit of  G  such that
, and let  be an open neighborhood of the
H-invariant center  of the quotient G/H  which consists of elements

Then there is a local section  of 

With this local section, one can define the induced representation, called the nonlinear realization, of elements  on  given by the expressions

The corresponding nonlinear realization of a Lie algebra
 of G takes the following form.

,

In physical models, the coefficients  are treated as Goldstone fields. Similarly, nonlinear realizations of Lie superalgebras  are considered.

See also 
Induced representation
Chiral model

References 
 
 
 Giachetta G., Mangiarotti L., Sardanashvily G., Advanced Classical Field Theory, World Scientific, 2009, .

 
Representation theory
Theoretical physics